Compound Junior is a public art work by artist Beverly Pepper located at the Lynden Sculpture Garden near Milwaukee, Wisconsin.  The stainless steel sculpture is an abstract bent line. The form's ends are pressed to the ground horizontally and its middle is jutting upward vertically; it is installed on the lawn.

References

Outdoor sculptures in Milwaukee
1970 sculptures
Steel sculptures in Wisconsin
1970 establishments in Wisconsin
Stainless steel sculptures in the United States